Nameless Hero, The Nameless Hero or Nameless Heroes may refer to:

 The Nameless Hero, a fictional character in the Gothic (series) game series
 The Nameless Hero, a 2013 children's book by Lee Bacon
 The Nameless Hero, a fictional character in the Piled Higher and Deeper newspaper and webcomic strip
 Unsung Heroes, or Nameless Heroes, a North Korean war drama mini-series 1978–1981
 Nameless Heroes (film), a 1925 German silent film

See also
 Nameless (disambiguation)
 Unsung Heroes (disambiguation)
 The Unknown Warrior